Karl Machus (1884–1944) was a German art director. Along with Erich Zander he designed the sets for most of the films made by director Veit Harlan during the Nazi era.

Selected filmography
 Prince Cuckoo (1919)
 Blonde Poison (1919)
 Love (1919)
 The Night of Decision (1920)
 Hate (1920)
 Battle of the Sexes (1920)
 The Story of a Maid (1921)
 Sons of the Night (1921)
 The Inheritance (1922)
 The Testament of Joe Sivers (1922)
 The Duke of Aleria (1923)
 The Emperor's Old Clothes (1923)
 The Blame (1924)
 The Tragedy of the Dishonoured (1924)
 Two Children (1924)
 The Iron Bride (1925)
 Oh Those Glorious Old Student Days (1925)
 Reveille: The Great Awakening (1925)
 Love's Joys and Woes (1926)
 Watch on the Rhine (1926)
 We'll Meet Again in the Heimat (1926)
 Annemarie and Her Cavalryman (1926)
 Our Daily Bread (1926)
 Department Store Princess (1926)
 The False Prince (1927)
 Orient Express (1927)
 The Eighteen Year Old (1927)
 Endangered Girls (1927)
 U-9 Weddigen (1927)
 The Great Unknown (1927)
 Eva in Silk (1928)
 Lemke's Widow (1928)
 The Page Boy at the Golden Lion (1928)
 Children of the Street (1929)
 They May Not Marry (1929)
 Painted Youth (1929)
 Three Days of Life and Death (1929)
 Spell of the Looking Glass (1932)
 Viennese Waltz (1932)
 Three Bluejackets and a Blonde (1933)
 Ripening Youth (1933)
 The Hour of Temptation (1936)
 Robert and Bertram (1939)

References

Bibliography 
 Noack, Frank. Veit Harlan: The Life and Work of a Nazi Filmmaker. University Press of Kentucky, 2016.

External links 
 

1884 births
1944 deaths
German art directors
Film people from Berlin